Westbound is an adjective meaning "movement towards the west". It may refer to:

Westbound (1924 film), starring J. B. Warner and Molly Malone
Westbound (film), a 1959 American western film
"Westbound" (song), a 2007 unreleased song by Lana Del Rey (under the pseudonym May Jailer)
"Westbound" (The Zeta Project episode)
Westbound Records, Detroit-based record label founded in 1970

See also
Southbound (disambiguation)